Coryphellina cerverai is a species of sea slug, an aeolid nudibranch, a marine gastropod mollusc in the family Flabellinidae.

Distribution
This species was described from Chile.

References

Flabellinidae
Gastropods described in 2007
Endemic fauna of Chile